The Hvalbiartunnilin (Hvalba Tunnel) is the name applied to two tunnels on the island of Suðuroy, the most southerly of the Faroe Islands. The original Hvalbiartunnilin is the oldest tunnel in the country, while the new Hvalbiartunnilin is the newest (as of 2021). Both tunnels connect the villages of Hvalba and Trongisvágur. The tunnels are owned and maintained by the public works authority Landsverk.

History
The centuries before the tunnel arrived, Hvalba and Trongisvágur were connected by a footpath via the Krákugjógv. Construction of the Hvalbiartunnilin started in 1961 and it opened in 1963, as the first tunnel in the country. It closed on 8 May 2021 with the opening of the new tunnel. The old tunnel was an unlit, one-lane tunnel, measuring 1,450 metres in length. Because of its limited clearance of 3.2 metres, it could not handle modern-sized large vehicles, which typically measure 3.7 to 4.0 meters, including lorries, trailers and touringcars. This impededed transport to the rest of the country. Northbound traffic had to yield to southbound traffic in passing places, slowing down transit and reducing road safety.

In 2017 it was decided to replace the old tunnel with a new tunnel. This tunnel, with two lanes and a clearance of 4.5 meters, measures 2,500 metres in length. Boring started on 27 June 2019 and finished on 7 July 2020. A new access road of 2.4 kilometres was constructed on the Hvalba side and 1.4 km on the Trongisvágur side. The tunnel is built by ArtiCon and LNS. It cost 272 million DKK. The tunnel opened on 8 May 2021 with a ceremony, oldtimers and a convoy of lorries that previously could not access Hvalba. The old tunnel will be repurposed, although it will continue to be used for motor traffic as a back-up connection when the new tunnel is closed for any reason.

The new Hvalbiartunnilin would gain additional importance if the subsea Suðuroyartunnilin is constructed between Sandvík on Suðuroy and the isle of Sandoy. This tunnel is yet to be decided upon, but should according to plans open around 2030. Sandoy is connected to capital Tórshavn and the rest of the country via the Sandoyartunnilin.

The footpath between Hvalba and Trongisvágur is a popular hiking route.

See also 

 List of tunnels of the Faroe Islands

References 

Tunnels in the Faroe Islands
Tunnels completed in 1961